This is a list of programs broadcast on Nickelodeon (Russia) until closing. It does not include programs from sister channels nor other countries.

Final programming

Reruns of ended series

Former programming

Animated series
 Rugrats (1998-2015, 2017–18)
 Hey, Arnold! (1998-2015, 2017–18)
 CatDog (1998-2015, 2017–18)
 The Ren & Stimpy Show (1998-2005, 2008-2010, 2013–14)
 Rocko's Modern Life (1998-2009, 2014)
 AAHHH!!! Real Monsters (1998-2005)
 The Adventures of Jimmy Neutron, Boy Genius (February 8, 2003 – November 1, 2020)
 My Life as a Teenage Robot (May 3, 2004 – April 3, 2016)
 Danny Phantom (January 15, 2006 – January 4, 2020)
 Kappa Mikey (2007-2010)
 Catscratch (2007-2010)
 The Fairly Odd Parents (December 3, 2007 — 2008; March 1, 2010 — December 27, 2020)
 Wayside (2008-2010)
 El Tigre: The Adventures of Manny Rivera (2008-2010)
 Mr. Meaty (2008)
 The Mighty B! (February 16, 2009 — March 14, 2016)
 Tak and the Power of Juju (2009–10)
 Fanboy and Chum Chum (2010-2020) 
 Planet Sheen (2011-2016)
 Winx Club (2011-2016)
 T.U.F.F. Puppy (September 5, 2011 — February 23, 2020)
 Robot and Monster (April 1, 2013 — March 2, 2018)
 Harvey Beaks (June 13, 2015 ― February 1, 2019)
 Get Blake! (2015-2021)
 Bunsen is a Beast (2017-2019)
 Welcome to the Wayne (2017-2019)
 Ollie's Pack (September 26, 2020 ― March 20, 2022)
 The Barbarian and the Troll (2021–22)

Live-action series
 All That (1998-2005, 2020–21)
 Unfabulous (2008-2015)
 Drake & Josh (2008-2015)
 Romeo! (2008-2010)
 True Jackson, VP (2010-2012)
 Cousins for Life (2019–20)
 Noobees (April 1, 2019 – March 31, 2021)
 Overlord and the Underwoods (2022)

Preschool series
 Dora the Explorer (2004-2018)
 Peppa Pig (Autumn 2004 — February 27, 2009)
 Go, Diego, Go! (2006-2016)
 Wonder Pets (2007-2016)
 Team Umizoomi (2010-2016)
 Bubble Guppies (2011-2021)
 Kikoriki (2012-2016)
 The Fixies (2015-2017)
 Tickety Toc (2012-2015)
 Rusty Rivets (2016-2020)
 Nella the Princess Knight (2017-2020)
 Sunny Day (2018-2020)
 Top Wing (2018-2021)
 44 Cats (February 18, 2019 – 2021)
 Butterbean's Café (2019-2021)
 Abby Hatcher (June 8, 2019 — 2021)
 Corn & Peg (2020–21)
 Deer Squad (2021)

References

Lists of television series by network